William Nevill, de facto 16th (de jure 1st) Baron Bergavenny, (before 1701 – 1744) was an English peer who held office in the British Royal Household and built a country mansion.

Life
The son of Edward Nevill (1664-1701), a Captain in the Royal Navy who died aboard a ship off the coast of Virginia, and his wife Hannah (1668-1764), daughter of Gervase Thorpe of Brockhurst, he succeeded to the barony on the death of his cousin Edward Nevill, 15th Baron Bergavenny, who had died without children.

On 20 May 1725, he married his cousin's widow, who was Katharine, daughter of Lieutenant-General William Tatton and his wife Elizabeth Bull. Their elder son was George Nevill, 1st Earl of Abergavenny. Katharine died on 4 December 1729 after giving birth to a second son and on 20 May 1732 he married Lady Rebecca Herbert, daughter of Thomas Herbert, 8th Earl of Pembroke and his wife Margaret Sawyer, with whom he had more children.

Leaving the family's old house at Birling, Kent, he moved to Kidbrooke Park at Forest Row, where he built a mansion in 1733-4, purchasing surrounding farmland to lay out new grounds and a park. Altered since then, house and gardens in 2015 were the site of Michael Hall School).

In 1739 he obtained the position of Master of the Jewel Office, a post he held up to his death. He died in Bath on 21 September 1744 and was buried at East Grinstead on 30 September 1744, with the administration of his estate granted on 20 November 1744.

References

1744 deaths
William
18th-century English landowners
Masters of the Jewel Office
Barons in the Peerage of Great Britain
People from Birling, Kent
People from Forest Row